The 10th Louisiana Infantry (African descent) was a regiment in the Union Army during the American Civil War.  It was composed primarily of freed or escaped slaves from Louisiana's plantations and was commanded by white officers.

Vicksburg Campaign
The unit was organized at Lake Providence and Goodrich Landing, Louisiana, between May 6 and August 8, 1863. It was attached to the Goodrich Landing post until January 1864 and at Vicksburg until March 1864.

Yazoo River Expedition
The regiment participated in the Yazoo River Expedition between February 1 and March 8, 1864. Action was seen at Liverpool Heights, Mississippi, on February 4 (with the 11th Illinois Infantry and the First Mississippi Cavary) and Satartia, Mississippi, on February 7. Yazoo City, Mississippi, was captured by Union forces on February 4 and the regiment occupied the city between February 9 and March 6. There was a skirmish at Yazoo city on March 5.

48th Regiment Infantry U.S. Colored Troops

The regiment was designated the 48th Regiment Infantry, U.S. Colored Troops on March 11, 1864. The regiment participated in the expedition from Vicksburg to Rodney and Fayette, Mississippi, between September 29 and October 3, 1864. The unit was sent to Algiers, Louisiana, on February 26, 1865, and then to Fort Barrancas, Florida. Between March 20 and April 1, they marched from Pensacola, Florida, to Blakely, Alabama,

The regiment fought in the Battle of Fort Blakely, April 2–9, 1865 and then marched to Montgomery April 13–25. They were at Montgomery until June 1865 and then went to Texas where they were on duty along the Rio Grande until January 1866. The regiment mustered out on January 4, 1866.

See also

List of Louisiana Union Civil War units

References

External links
10th Louisiana Infantry, African Descent – Vicksburg National Military Park

Infantry, 010
Louisiana Infantry, 010
Military units and formations established in 1863
1863 establishments in Louisiana
Military units and formations disestablished in 1864